Marco Iansiti is a professor at the Harvard Business School, whose primary research interest is technology and operations strategy and the management of innovation.  He is the David Sarnoff Professor of Business Administration, heads the Technology and Operations Management Unit, and chairs the Digital Initiative.  He is also the Chairman of the Board of Keystone Strategy, a consultancy focused on strategy, data sciences and economics for technology clients.

Education 

Iansiti graduated summa cum laude from Harvard University in 1983, with an A.B. in Physics.  He subsequently went on to perform his Ph.D. in Physics at Harvard University  Iansiti's Ph.D. thesis focused on experimental low temperature electronics and semiconductor microfabrication techniques.  He won the Robbins Physics Prize in 1986, and was awarded his Ph.D. in September 1988.  He was awarded an IBM post-doctoral fellowship for 1988–1989, and performed research on the design and fabrication of next-generation microelectronic devices at Harvard University.

Career 

Iansiti's academic research at the Harvard Business School has focused on technological innovation, product development, entrepreneurship, and operations-specifically the drivers of productivity, flexibility, and adaptation in organizations.  He is the author or coauthor of more than 50 articles, papers, book chapters, cases, and notes.  Iansiti has also taught a variety of Executive Education and MBA courses on innovation, entrepreneurship, and operations, and is the creator of two Harvard Business School courses: "Managing Product Development" and "Starting New Ventures" (with Harvard Business School Professor Myra Hart).

Iansiti has performed consultant and advisory roles focusing on strategy and innovation for a variety of Fortune 500 companies.  He has also testified as an expert witness before the European Commission and United States Department of Justice regarding antitrust and intellectual property issues in the high-tech industry.

Development of the field of Ecosystem Strategy 

Iansiti helped develop the field of Ecosystem Strategy, which focuses on the creation of firm-level strategies that are intimately connected to the surrounding business ecosystem. Iansiti built upon the previous work of James F. Moore, the founder of the field of Ecosystem Strategy, and is considered the current thought leader in the field.  Iansiti examined firms such as Microsoft Corporation and Walmart, and found that the success of these firms depended heavily on the sustained health of complex networks of customers, suppliers, and competitors:

Many industries today behave like a massively interconnected network of organizations, technologies, consumers and products. Perhaps the most dramatic and widely known example is the computing industry. In contrast with the vertically integrated environment of the 1960s and 1970s, today's industry is divided into a large number of segments producing specialized products, technologies and services. The degree of interaction between firms in the industry is truly astounding, with hundreds of organizations frequently involved in the design, production, distribution, or implementation of even a single product. And because of this increasingly distributed industry structure, the focus of competition is shifting away from the management of internal resources, to the management and influence of assets that are outside the direct ownership and control of the firm.

Iansiti went on to define the roles required for a business ecosystem to be considered healthy, including Keystones that provide a foundation for connecting and supporting other organizations within the ecosystem.  This field of strategy provides insights for industries in which interdependencies and engagement with customers and suppliers are critical.

Contribution to Understanding the role of Information Technology in Modern Businesses 

Iansiti has made a significant contribution to the field of Information Technology (IT) strategy, developing a framework for the assessment of capabilities created through firm-level investment in IT. Iansiti's work in this area built upon research by others that had explored the link between IT investment and enterprise growth, breaking enterprise growth into the capabilities IT enables and examining the impact of these individual capabilities on enterprise performance.  This more nuanced approach led to a framework for assessing an organizations' level of IT maturity, referred to as the IT Scorecard.  This scorecard allowed the return on an organization's IT investment to be measured more accurately than had been possible previously, and provided a more action-oriented assessment that could be used, for example, to focus improvement efforts on under-developed IT capabilities.

In early 2017, Iansiti teamed up with Prof. Karim Lakhani on a Harvard Business Review article where they said blockchain is not a disruptive technology that undercuts the cost of an existing business model, but is a foundational technology that "has the potential to create new foundations for our economic and social systems". They further predicted that, while foundational innovations can have enormous impact, "It will take decades for blockchain to seep into our economic and social infrastructure."

Contribution to Understanding the Digital Transformation of Business 

Iansiti more recently made a contribution to the field of technology strategy to understand the phenomenon of digital transformation. Iansiti's work in this area is in collaboration with Prof. Karim Lakhani, also of the Harvard Business School.  It explores the evolution of models for value creation and capture as businesses increase in digital content.  Examples range from General Electric to Google.

Key publications 

Books

One Strategy: Organization, Planning, and Decision Making (Wiley, 2009).
Iansiti writes with Steven Sinofsky of Microsoft Corporation on the gap that often develops between top-down, directed strategy and bottom-up, emergent behavior within an organization.  Iansiti and Sinofsky discuss the approach Sinofsky took within the Windows and Windows Live Group at Microsoft to bridge this gap during the development of the Windows 7 operating system.
The Keystone Advantage: What the New Dynamics of Business Ecosystems Mean for Strategy, Innovation, and Sustainability (Harvard Business School Press, 2004)  
Iansiti writes with Roy Levien about the concept of the business ecosystem, whereby complex business networks can be thought of as interdependent ecosystems.  Within this context, Iansiti discusses the role of Keystones, firms that create a platform that sustains and enhances the health and performance of the business ecosystem.
Technology Integration: Making Critical Choices in a Turbulent World (Harvard Business School Press, 1997)  
Iansiti writes about the choices faced by high-tech firms regarding the adoption and integration of new technologies into the firm's offerings.  Iansiti assesses the performance of technology integration projects and makes suggestions for organizational best practices.

Board memberships 
Current Chairman of the Board, Keystone Strategy, Inc.
Current Board Member, ModuleQ
Current Board Member, iMatchative
Current Board Member, PDF Solutions
Former Board Member, CHiL Semiconductor
Former Board Member, Eurizon Financial Group
Former Board Member, Supplier Market, Inc.
Former Board Member, Model N Corporation
Former Board Member, Ide Corporation
Former Board Member, Leonardo-Finmeccanica SpA
Former Board Member, NextDoor Networks

External links 
 Harvard Business School Faculty page

References

Harvard Business School faculty
Living people
Harvard College alumni
Italian emigrants to the United States
Year of birth missing (living people)